Zayn al-Din Sayyed Isma‘il ibn Husayn Gorgani (c. 1040–1136), also spelled al-Jurjani, was a Persian 12th century royal Islamic physician from Gorgan, Iran. In addition to medical and pharmaceutical sciences, he was also an adept in theological, philosophic, and ethical sciences. Jurjani was a pupil of Ibn Abi Sadiq and Ahmad ibn Farrokh. He arrived at the court in the Persian province of Khwarazm in the year 1110 when he was already a septuagenarian. There he became a court physician to the governor of the province, Khwarazm-Shah Qutb al-Din Muhammad I, who ruled from 1097 to 1127. It was to him that he dedicated his most comprehensive and influential work, the Persian-language compendium Zakhirah-i Khvarazm'Shahi.

Jurjani continued as court physician to Khwarazm'Shah Qutb al-Din's son and successor, Ala al-Din Atsiz, until at some unspecified time he moved to the city of Merv, the capital of the rival Seljuq Sultan Sanjar (ruled 1118–1157), where he died nearly at 100 lunar years of age.

Jurjani composed a number of important medical and philosophical treatises, in both Persian and Arabic, most of them written after he moved to Khwarazm at the age of 70 lunar years.

Thesaurus of the Shah of Khwarazm
Al-Jurjani wrote the Persian medical encyclopedia, Thesaurus of the Shah of Khwarazm (also known as The Treasure of Khwarazm Shah), sometime after 1110, when he moved to the northern Persian province of Khwarezm. Much of his work was dependent on Avicenna's The Canon of Medicine (c. 1025), along with al-Jurjani's own ideas not found in the Canon. The work is composed of ten volumes covering ten medical fields: anatomy, physiology, hygiene, diagnosis and prognosis, fevers, diseases particular to a part of the body, surgery, skin diseases, poisons and antidotes, and medicaments (both simple and compound). In endocrinology , in particular, al-Jurjani was one of "the first to associate exophthalmos with goitre," which was not repeated until Caleb Parry (1755–1822) in 1825, and later by Robert James Graves (1796–1853) and Carl von Basedow (1799–1854). Al-Jurjani also established an association between goitre and palpitation.

On "Drugs recommended for lice control," Gorgani recommends the following method:

Most of the above botanicals have recently been shown to possess especially insecticidal properties.

Works
Some of his works are:

 Zakhireh-i Kharazmshahi, a ten volume encyclopedia of medical sciences
 Khafi Alayee, a summary of Zakhireh-i Kharazmshahi
 Al-Iqraz al-Tebbieh and Al-Mabahis al-Alaieh, 
 Tib Yadegar
 Kitab-fi-Hifz al-Sihat (Book on Preserving Health)
 Book on Anatomy
 Zubdah al-Tib, a discussion of medicine and pharmacology (Arabic)
 Al tazkereh al-Ashrafyeh fi Asnaah al-Tebbieh, an Arabic translation of Khafi Alayee
 Al-Tib al-Mulkuki 
 Kitab al-Manbah or Al-Risalah al-Manbah, a book on ethics and resisting desires and passions,
 Kitab Tadbir al-Yaum va Laylah, a book on ethics and morality,
 Kitab Nameh, about ethics
 Fi al-Qias, a philosophical work
 Fi al-Tahlil, another philosophical work
 Al-Zakhireh al-Kharazmshahieh, a translation of Zakhireh-i Kharazmshahi into Arabic
 Al-Kazemieh, a philosophical treatise 
 Al-Javiah al-Tebbiah va al Mabahes al-alaiyeh, (authorship disputed)
 Kitab fi al-Rad al-Phalasifah

See also
 List of Iranian scientists

References

Golshani S A. Sayyed Ismael Jorjani, The famous Iranian physician and philosopher. Jorjani Biomed J. 2014; 2 (2) :71-69. URL: http://goums.ac.ir/jorjanijournal/article-1-318-fa.html]

Sources
 Gignoux, P. (2015) “Anatomy and Therapy of Eye-Diseases in Esmā῾īl Gorgānī Compared to Syriac Sources,” in Krasnowolska, A. and Rusek-Kowalska, R. (eds) Studies on the Iranian World: Medieval and Modern. Jagiellonian University Press, pp. 341–346.
 B. Thierry de Crussol des Epesse, Discours sur l'oeil d'Esma`il Gorgani (Teheran: Institut Français de Recherche en Iran, 1998), pp. 7–13.
 Lutz Richter-Bernburg, Persian Medical Manuscripts at the University of California, Los Angeles: A Descriptive Catalogue, Humana Civilitas, vol. 4 (Malibu: Udena Publications, 1978). pp. 208
 C.A. Storey, Persian Literature: A Bio-Bibliographical Survey. Volume II, Part 2: E.Medicine (London: Royal Asiatic Society, 1971), pp 207–211 no. 361
 The article "Djurdjani" by J. Schacht in The Encyclopaedia of Islam, 2nd edition, ed. by H.A.R. Gibbs, B. Lewis, Ch. Pellat, C. Bosworth et al., 11 vols. (Leiden: E.J. Brill, 1960–2002)  (2nd ed.), vol. 2, p. 603
 The article "Dakira-ye Kvarazmshahi" by `Ali-Akbar Sa`idi Sirjani in Encyclopædia Iranica, ed. Ehsan Yarshater, 6+ vols. (London: Routledge & Kegan Paul and Costa Mesa: Mazda, 1983 to present), vol. 6 (1999) pp. 609–610.
 Shoja MM, Tubbs RS. The history of anatomy in Persia. J Anat 2007; 210:359–378.
 A Research Conducted on the Life and Works of Hakim Sayyid Esmail Jurjani, Mohammad Reza Shams Ardekani, Fariborz Moatar. Journal of the International Society for the History of Islamic Medicine, Vol 4, No 7, April 2005.

1136 deaths
12th-century Iranian physicians
Pharmacologists of medieval Iran
People from Gorgan
1040s births
Iranian inventors
Court physicians